Ariel Bordeaux is an American alternative cartoonist, painter, and writer. She is known for the confessional autobiographical minicomics series Deep Girl and the two-person title (with her husband Rick Altergott) Raisin Pie.

Life and career 
Bordeaux graduated from the School of the Museum of Fine Arts at Tufts in 1991.

Bordeaux self-published five issues of the Deep Girl minicomic during the years 1993 to 1995. (Paper Rocket Minicomics collected all five issues in a book called The Complete Deep Girl in 2013.)

In the mid-1990s, Bordeaux illustrated stories in Dennis Eichhorn's Real Stuff series, published by Fantagraphics. Later in the decade, she also contributed stories to anthologies like Aeon Publications's On Our Butts; Sarah Dyer's Action Girl Comics; Peter Bagge's Hate; Fantagraphics' Dirty Stories, Spicecapades, and Measles; and DC's Bizarro Comics.

Bordeaux and Deep Girl were nominated for the 1997 Kimberly Yale Award for Best New Talent (part of the Lulu Awards). That same year, Drawn & Quarterly published her romance graphic novel No Love Lost.

Bordeaux served on the 2003 Ignatz Award jury.

In the 2000s, in addition to Raisin Pie, she contributed work to a number of anthologies, including Alternative Comics' zombie anthology Bogus Dead (2002), Friends of Lulu's Broad Appeal (2003), the middle school-stories anthology Stuck in the Middle: 17 Comics from an Unpleasant Age (Viking Juvenile, 2007), and the Center for Cartoon Studies' The Cartoon Crier (2012).

In 2012, Bordeaux received her MFA from the Center for Cartoon Studies. She currently works as a Special Collections Associate at Rhode Island School of Design.

Personal life 
Bordeaux is married to fellow cartoonist Rick Altergott.

Bibliography 
 Deep Girl (5 issues, self-published, Mar. 1993–Summer 1995)
 Ink Geek Comics (one-shot, self-published, Nov. 1993) — with Adrian Tomine
 No Love Lost (Drawn & Quarterly, 1997) 
 Raisin Pie (5 issues, Fantagraphics, Oct. 2002–July 2007) — with Rick Altergott
 Henparty (1 issue, self-published, 2006)
 The Complete Deep Girl (Paper Rocket Minicomics, 2013)

References

Notes

Sources consulted 
 
 
 Sullivan, Darcy. "Ariel Bordeaux," The Comics Journal #205 (June 1998), pp. 77–78.
 "Young Cartoonists Roundtable, Seattle," The Comics Journal #188 (July 1996), pp. 125–134.

External links 
 
 Nick M. "...ariel bordeaux finds happiness... a comix Q & A," The Subversive Garden (October 15, 2007).
 Bordeaux bio at Lambiek's Comiclopedia

Year of birth missing (living people)
Living people
American women cartoonists
Alternative cartoonists
School of the Museum of Fine Arts at Tufts alumni
American cartoonists
21st-century American women